Katrin Linde (born 27 September 1951 Tallinn) is an Estonian artist and politician. She was a member of VII Riigikogu.

References

Living people
1951 births
20th-century Estonian women artists
21st-century Estonian women artists
Members of the Riigikogu, 1992–1995
Women members of the Riigikogu
Artists from Tallinn
Politicians from Tallinn